Luis F. Cruz Batista is a certified public accountant and the current director of the Puerto Rico Office of Management and Budget (OGP in Spanish). Before his appointment Cruz served as director of the Commission on Treasury and Budget of the 29th House of Representatives. He had also run his own private accounting firm since 1994 and had previously offered consulting services to OGP as a private consultant.

Academically, Cruz possesses a bachelor's degree in accounting from the University of Puerto Rico and a master's degree from the Interamerican University of Puerto Rico.

Notes

References

Year of birth missing (living people)
Living people
Directors of the Puerto Rico Office of Management and Budget
Members of the 16th Cabinet of Puerto Rico